Klaus Richtzenhain (born 1 November 1934 in Berlin) is a retired East German athlete who competed mainly in the 1,500 metres.

He competed for the United Team of Germany in the 1956 Summer Olympics held in Melbourne, Australia in the 1,500 metres where he won the silver medal.

External links
Sports Reference

1934 births
Living people
East German male middle-distance runners
Olympic athletes of the United Team of Germany
Olympic silver medalists for the United Team of Germany
Athletes (track and field) at the 1956 Summer Olympics
Athletes from Berlin
Medalists at the 1956 Summer Olympics
Olympic silver medalists in athletics (track and field)